Neuhaus is a German surname meaning "new house".

Geographical distribution
As of 2014, 68.0% of all known bearers of the surname Neuhaus were residents of Germany (frequency 1:4,092), 11.7% of the United States (1:106,942), 10.1% of Switzerland (1:2,808) and 5.8% of Brazil (1:122,170).

In Germany, the frequency of the surname was higher than national average (1:4,092) in the following states:
 1. North Rhine-Westphalia (1:1,341)
 2. Bremen (1:3,022)

In Switzerland, the frequency of the surname was higher than national average (1:2,808) in the following cantons:
 1. Canton of Fribourg (1:315)
 2. Canton of Bern (1:1,527)
 3. Canton of Neuchâtel (1:2,258)
 4. Canton of Solothurn (1:2,311)
 5. Canton of Aargau (1:2,435)

People
Florian Neuhaus, German footballer
Gert Neuhaus (born 1939), German artist
Heinrich Neuhaus (1888–1964), Soviet pianist
Max Neuhaus (1939–2009), American percussionist
Richard John Neuhaus (1936–2009), American-Canadian Catholic priest and writer
Stanislav Neuhaus (1927–1980), Soviet pianist, son of Heinrich

See also

 Niehaus, Low German variant of the name
 Niehues, Westphalian variant of the name

References

German-language surnames
Surnames of German origin